Care Bears is an animated television series based on the franchise of the same name. The series was produced by DIC Audiovisuel's American branch DIC Enterprises and aired on syndication a while after the theaterical release of the first movie in the series.

In 1986, The Care Bears Family, a successor series by the Canadian studio Nelvana that had produced the movies, aired on Global in Canada and on ABC in the United States.

In 2007, Sabella Dern Entertainment produced a revival, Care Bears: Adventures in Care-a-Lot.

Synopsis

The Care Bears live in a faraway place up in the clouds called Care-a-Lot, which constitutes a part of the Kingdom of Caring. With the help of the Cousins and their Buddies, they go all around the world on Missions in Caring whilst they try to thwart the plans of the evil Professor Coldheart.

Episodes

Voice cast

 Billie Mae Richards – Tenderheart Bear, David's Mother, Jill Wayland's Mother, Keith, Kara's Mother, Matthew Miller
 Jayne Eastwood – Birthday Bear, Tommy, Willis Carter
 Janet-Laine Green – Wish Bear, Mary, Mrs. Miller (Matthew Miller's Mother), Tricia
 Luba Goy – Gentle Heart Lamb, Lotsa Heart Elephant, Susie's Mother
 Eva Almos – Friend Bear, Swift Heart Rabbit, Cathy, Charlie, Elaine, Jimmy, Kathy, Lisa, Melanie, Millie Jacobs' Mother, Sanford
 Linda Sorenson – Love-a-Lot Bear, Amy, Benny, Jeffrey, Jill Wayland, Kara, Lisa's Mother, Mrs. Peale (Patti Johnson's Teacher), Paula Schaefer, Sandra, Talking Star, Wendy
 Melleny Brown – Cheer Bear, Becky, Missy, Millie Jacobs
 Len Carlson – Professor Coldheart, Jim, Strato Nefarious
 Louise Vallance – Proud Heart Cat, Mary
 Dan Hennessey – Good Luck Bear, Brave Heart Lion, Loyal Heart Dog, Captain McDougal, Cloud Worm, Counselor Bob, Dentist, Mr. Miller (Matthew Miller's Father), Mayor of Abbotsville
 Pauline Rennie – Cozy Heart Penguin, Treat Heart Pig, Melanie's Mother, Timmy
 Patrice Black – Funshine Bear, Share Bear, Chris, Eddie, Joey, Joey and Elaine's Mother, Linda, Mary's Mother
 Laurie Waller Benson – Doug, Hal, Jill, Millie Jacob's Teacher, Murphy, Susie, Talking Star
 Theresa Sears – Champ Bear, Amy, Fred, Joshua
 Bob Dermer – Grumpy Bear, Frostbite, Amy's Husband, Carl, Charlie, David, Eddie, Firefighter, Joey and Elaine's Father, Ken, Mr. Bland (Mayor of Drab City), Mr. Poole, Narrator, Race Flag Man
 Joyce Gordon – Auntie Freeze

Uncredited 
 Sean Roberge – Bedtime Bear
 Jim Henshaw – Bright Heart Raccoon, Jeff, Jill Wayland's Father, Melanie's Father, Mr. Johnson (Patti Johnson's Father)
 Marla Lukofsky – Playful Heart Monkey, Patti Johnson
 Brennan Thicke – Joey

Home media

United States 
The series has seen a few VHS releases from DIC Video and Buena Vista Home Video throughout the 1980s and 1990s.

In March 2003, Sterling Entertainment released three releases on VHS and DVD: "Bedtime Stories", "The Last Laugh" and "To the Rescue". Each release contained six or seven episodes, with a bonus episode on the DVD version, while "To the Rescue" contained a bonus Sylvanian Families episode. An additional DVD, "Daydreams", was released on February 4, 2004, and contained a Strawberry Shortcake short as a bonus on the DVD version.

Sterling would later release all 22 episodes in seven-volume collections in 2004 entitled Celebration, Dreamland, Forever Friends, Land of Enchantment, Starry Skies, Tenderheart Tales and Fun in the Sun.

In 2007, 20th Century Fox Home Entertainment acquired the rights to the original DIC series and re-released all the DIC-produced episodes on DVD in five-volume collections entitled Care-A-Lot Adventures, Forest of Feelings, Magical Moments, Carousel of Dreams and Sharing in the Sunshine.

On August 26, 2008, 20th Century Fox Home Entertainment released Care Bears: Care-A-Lot Collection on DVD in Region 1.  The two-disc set features all 22 episodes of the series.

In 2013, Mill Creek Entertainment acquired the rights to the series and subsequently released three-volume collections which contain six episodes each, on September 10, 2013.

On October 6, 2015, Mill Creek released The Care Bears – The Complete Original Series on DVD in Region 1. The two-disc set features all 22 episodes of the series.

International 
In the United Kingdom, Maximum Entertainment released the whole DIC series on four DVD sets and two VHS releases under license from Jetix Europe (who at the time, owned the pre-1990 DIC library).

Volume 1, released in August 2004 contained the first two episodes (1 on the VHS) alongside the Freeze Machine and Land without Feelings specials. Volume 2, released in October 2004 contained five episodes, and The Magic Shop (released in February 2005) and The Girl who Cried Wolf (released in August 2005) each contained three episodes, with the Freeze Machine special appearing on the latter again for an unknown reason, likely as filler. Both sets were released in two compilations titled "Volumes 1 and 2" (released in January 2005) and "Wedding Bells" (Released in May 2005), each containing two discs with their respective volumes.

The separate volumes were re-released again in 2007, with the former two volumes being released simply as Care Bears. Another compilation titled Happy Birthday, Care Bears was released by Maximum in February 2008, containing 12 episodes set within two discs. Lace DVD re-issued the DVDs again in 2011 as well was releasing the entire series in a four-disc boxset. These versions are identical to Maximum's releases.

In 2016, Platform Entertainment would release four DVDs of the series.

References

External links

 

1985 American television series debuts
1985 American television series endings
1980s American animated television series
1985 Canadian television series debuts
1985 Canadian television series endings
1980s Canadian animated television series
1985 French television series debuts
1980s French animated television series
American children's animated fantasy television series
Animated television series about bears
Animated television shows based on films
Anime-influenced Western animated television series
Care Bears (television series)
Canadian children's animated fantasy television series
First-run syndicated television programs in the United States
French children's animated fantasy television series
Television series about shapeshifting
Television about magic
Television series by DIC Entertainment
Television series set in fictional countries
Television shows based on Hasbro toys
English-language television shows